Adolf Rambold (5 October 1900 – 14 May 1996) was a German inventor and engineer.

Life
Rambold worked for the German company Teekanne since 1924. In 1929, he invented the tea bag packing machine called Pompadour. In 1949, being a co-owner of Teepack he invented a modern form of tea bag - bag with 2 chambers which remains the most popular type of the tea bag till now. In the same year he proposed a new tea bag packing machine Constanta which produced 160 bags per minute.

See also 

List of German inventors and discoverers

References

External links
Focus.de:Adolf Rambold (German)
WDR:14. Mai 1996 – Teebeutel-Entwickler Adolf Rambold stirbt:Aroma aus der Doppelkammer (German)
Adolf Rambold, in: Sächsische Innovationen (German);  9 April 2013
Patents by Inventor Adolf Rambold

20th-century German inventors
Engineers from Stuttgart
1900 births
1996 deaths